Verkhneakbashevo (Ürge Aqbaş) is a rural locality (a village) in Sharipovsky Selsoviet, Kushnarenkovsky District, Bashkortostan, Russia. The population was 86 as of 2010. There are 3 streets.

Geography 
Verkhneakbashevo is located 29 km southeast of Kushnarenkovo (the district's administrative centre) by road. Voyetskoye is the nearest rural locality.

References 

Rural localities in Kushnarenkovsky District